Herrick is an extinct town in Jefferson County, in the U.S. state of Ohio. The GNIS classifies it as a populated place.

History
A post office called Herrick was established in 1904, and remained in operation until 1930. Herrick was originally a mining community and the O'Neal Coal Mining Company operated there.

References

Unincorporated communities in Jefferson County, Ohio
Unincorporated communities in Ohio